The Group B of the 1999 Copa América was one of the three groups of competing nations in the 1999 Copa América. It comprised Brazil, Chile, Venezuela, and Mexico. Group play began on June 30 and ended on July 6.

Brazil won the group and faced Argentina, the runner-up of Group C, in the quarterfinals. Mexico finished second and faced Peru, the runner-up of Group A, in the quarterfinals. Chile finished third and faced Colombia, the winner of Group C, in the quarterfinals. Venezuela finished fourth in the group and was eliminated from the tournament.

Standings

Teams that advanced to the quarterfinals
Group winners
Group runners-up
Best two third-placed teams among all groups

Matches

Chile v Mexico

Brazil v Venezuela

Brazil v Mexico

Chile v Venezuela

Mexico v Venezuela

Brazil v Chile

External links
Copa América 1999 Official Site

Group B
Group
Group
1999–2000 in Mexican football
Group